This is a list of diplomatic missions of Luxembourg, excluding honorary consulates. It is represented by Belgium in countries that do not host a Luxembourg diplomatic mission.

Africa

 Ouagadougou (Embassy)

 Praia (Embassy)

 Addis Ababa (Embassy)

 Casablanca (Trade and Investment Office)

 Niamey (Embassy)

 Dakar (Embassy)

America

 Brasília (Embassy)

 Washington, D.C. (Embassy)
 New York City (Consulate-General)
 San Francisco (Consulate-General)

Asia

 Beijing (Embassy)
 Shanghai (Consulate-General)

 New Delhi (Embassy)

 Tel Aviv (Trade and Investment Office)

 Tokyo (Embassy)

 Seoul (Trade and Investment Office)

 Vientiane (Embassy)

 Taipei (Trade and Investment Office)

 Bangkok (Embassy)

 Ankara (Embassy)
 
 Abu Dhabi (Embassy)

Europe

 Vienna (Embassy)

 Brussels (Embassy)

 Prague (Embassy)

 Copenhagen (Embassy)

 Paris (Embassy)
 Strasbourg (Consulate-General)

 Berlin (Embassy)

 Athens (Embassy)

 Rome (Ecclesiastical Counselor)

 Dublin (Embassy)

 Rome (Embassy)

 Pristina (Embassy)

 The Hague (Embassy)

 Warsaw (Embassy)

 Lisbon (Embassy)

 Moscow (Embassy)

 Madrid (Embassy)

 Bern (Embassy)

 London (Embassy)

Multilateral organizations
 Addis Ababa (Permanent Mission to the African Union)
 Brussels (Permanent Missions to the European Union and NATO)
 Geneva (Permanent Missions to the United Nations and other international organizations)
 New York (Permanent Mission to the United Nations)
 Paris (Permanent Missions to the Organisation for Economic Co-operation and Development and UNESCO)
 Rome (Permanent Mission to Food and Agriculture Organization)
 Strasbourg (Permanent Mission to the Council of Europe)
 Vienna (Permanent Mission to the United Nations and the Organization for Security and Co-operation in Europe)

Gallery

See also
 Ministry of Foreign Affairs (Luxembourg)
 Foreign relations of Luxembourg

Notes

References
Ministry of Foreign Affairs of Luxembourg (French/English)

 
Luxembourg diplomacy-related lists
Luxembourg